Kari Sihvonen is a Finnish professional ice hockey forward who currently plays for Arystan Temirtau of the Kazakhstan Hockey Championship.

References

External links

1983 births
Living people
Arystan Temirtau players
Beibarys Atyrau players
Espoo Blues players
Lahti Pelicans players
HPK players
Swedish expatriate ice hockey players in Finland
Yertis Pavlodar players
Finnish ice hockey left wingers